William Cooper (1798–1864) was an American naturalist, conchologist (shell zoologist) and collector.

Early life
Cooper studied zoology in Europe from 1821 to 1824, and afterwards travelled to Nova Scotia, Kentucky and the Bahamas collecting specimens.

Career
Although he was not an author himself his specimens were of great help to others, such as John James Audubon, Charles Lucien Bonaparte and Thomas Nuttall. 

Cooper was one of the founders of the New York Lyceum of Natural History (later the New York Academy of Sciences), and the first American member of the Zoological Society of London. Bonaparte named the Cooper's hawk for him, after Cooper collected a specimen of it in 1828.

Personal life
He was father of James Graham Cooper (1830–1902) a physician and famous naturalist in his own right.

References

1798 births
1864 deaths
Conchologists
Fellows of the Zoological Society of London